Endiandra hayesii  is an Australian rainforest tree. Despite the common name of rusty rose walnut, this tree is unrelated to northern hemisphere walnuts, and is a laurel. The former habitat is lowland sub tropical rainforest, most of which has been cleared. However some trees persist in cool sheltered gullies as far south as the Richmond River, New South Wales to just over the border at Burleigh Heads in Queensland. The rusty rose walnut is considered rare, with a ROTAP rating of 3RC-. It is named after H.C. Hayes, who collected this species at Minyon Falls.

Description 
Usually a small crooked tree, however at Minyon Falls is a 35 metre tall tree with a trunk diameter of 60 cm. The trunk is usually straight on smaller trees, but buttressed in larger trees. The bark is fairly smooth with some scales, grey or grey brown in colour. Small branches with rusty brown hairs. With furry yellow leaf buds.

Leaves 6 to 12 cm long, and 3 to 6 cm wide. Hairy and dull particularly on the underside, with reddish brown leaf hairs. Leaf stem hairy, 5 to 10 mm long. Leaves veiny on the underside.

Flowers & fruit 
Greenish white flowers form on panicles from October to November. Panicles form from leaf axils or at the end of branchlets. Petals up to 2 mm long. The fruit is a purplish black drupe, maturing from March to August. Tear drop shaped up to 3 cm long. The cream seed should be planted after the removal of the thin layer of green flesh.

References

Flora of New South Wales
Flora of Queensland
Trees of Australia
hayesii
Laurales of Australia
Vulnerable biota of Queensland
Vulnerable flora of Australia